Arthur Smith (17 March 1872 – 3 October 1952) was an English cricketer.  Smith was a right-handed batsman who bowled right-arm fast.  He was born at Barlestone, Leicestershire.

Smith made his first-class debut for Leicestershire against Yorkshire at Headingley in the 1897 County Championship.  He made two further first-class appearances in that season against Lancashire and the Marylebone Cricket Club, while his fourth and final first-class appearance came in the 1901 County Championship against Derbyshire.  Smith's main role was as a bowler, in his four first-class matches he took 5 wickets at an expensive average of 27.00, with best figures of 3/40.  With the bat, he scored 16 runs at a batting average of 2.66, with a high score of 9.

He died at Melton Mowbray, Leicestershire, on 3 October 1952.

References

External links
Arthur Smith at ESPNcricinfo
Arthur Smith at CricketArchive

1872 births
1952 deaths
People from Barlestone
Cricketers from Leicestershire
English cricketers
Leicestershire cricketers